Michel Stalh (1914–1989) was a resistant and a pastor of the Reformed Church. He was a compagnon de la Libération. He joined the Free France in June 1940. He was made compagnon de la Libération by a decree of 7 August 1945. After the war, he became pastor of the Reformed Church of France at Bordeaux and then at Mulhouse. Retired, he lived in Aimargues until his death.

External links 
 Page on the Ordre de la Libération's website

1914 births
Recipients of the War Cross with Sword (Norway)
Chevaliers of the Légion d'honneur
Companions of the Liberation
French Calvinist and Reformed ministers
People from Gard
1989 deaths